The Ogden Dodgers  were a Minor League Baseball team based in Ogden, Utah. The Ogden Dodgers played as members of the Pioneer Baseball League from 1966 to 1973. The Ogden Dodgers were an affiliate of the Los Angeles Dodgers (1966–1973). Future Baseball Hall of Fame Manager Tommy Lasorda managed the team from 1966-1968.

History

The Ogden Dodgers started in 1966 when the Pocatello Chiefs moved to Ogden and changed their name.  They won the Pioneer League championship their first four seasons in existence from 1966 to 1969.

When the club lost its Dodgers affiliation after the 1973 season, they spent the 1974 season as the Ogden Spikers, a co-op team that featured players from six different Major League organizations.

After the 1974 season, the franchise moved to Canada and became the Lethbridge Expos.

Notable alumni

Baseball Hall of Fame alumni
 Tommy Lasorda (1966-1968); inducted 1996

Notable alumni
 Bill Buckner (1968) MLB All-Star; 1982 NL batting title
 Steve Garvey (1968) 10x MLB All-Star; 1974 NL Most Valuable Player
 Charlie Hough (1966) MLB All-Star
 Lee Lacy (1969)
 Tom Paciorek (1968) MLB All-Star
 Bill Russell (1966) 3x MLB All-Star
 Eddie Solomon (1969)
 Bobby Valentine (1968); would also go on to a managerial career in MLB
 Steve Yeager (1967)  1981 World Series Most Valuable Player

References

External links
Baseball Reference

Los Angeles Dodgers minor league affiliates
Defunct minor league baseball teams
Defunct baseball teams in Utah
Defunct Pioneer League (baseball) teams
1966 establishments in Utah
1974 disestablishments in Utah
Professional baseball teams in Utah
Sports in Ogden, Utah
Baseball teams established in 1966
Baseball teams disestablished in 1973